The 1972 Tasmanian state election was held on 22 April 1972.

Retiring Members

Labor
Alexander Atkins MLA (Bass)

Centre
Kevin Lyons MLA (Braddon)

House of Assembly
Sitting members are shown in bold text. Tickets that elected at least one MHA are highlighted in the relevant colour. Successful candidates are indicated by an asterisk (*).

Bass
Seven seats were up for election. The Labor Party was defending three seats. The Liberal Party was defending four seats.

Braddon
Seven seats were up for election. The Labor Party was defending four seats. The Liberal Party was defending two seats. The Centre Party did not defend the one seat they had won in 1969.

Denison
Seven seats were up for election. The Labor Party was defending three seats. The Liberal Party was defending four seats.

Franklin
Seven seats were up for election. The Labor Party was defending four seats. The Liberal Party was defending three seats.

Wilmot
Seven seats were up for election. The Labor Party was defending three seats. The Liberal Party was defending four seats.

See also
 Members of the Tasmanian House of Assembly, 1969–1972
 Members of the Tasmanian House of Assembly, 1972–1976

References
Tasmanian Parliamentary Library

Candidates for Tasmanian state elections